Andino was a small automobile manufacturer around 1967 in Buenos Aires, Argentina. Andino built sports coupés using Renault engines.

External links
Andino GTA 1 

Manufacturing companies based in Buenos Aires
Defunct motor vehicle manufacturers of Argentina